MTV Brand New was an Italian television channel which played mainly indie music videos with many music-related themed zones and some productions from MTV USA like Beavis and Butt-Head, subtitled in Italian.
It was broadcast only on SKY Italia channel 706 (available also on Italian IPTV services).

The channel was replaced by MTV Rocks on 10 January 2011.

References

External links
 Official site 

MTV channels
Telecom Italia Media
Music television channels
Defunct television channels in Italy
Television channels and stations established in 2003
Television channels and stations disestablished in 2011
2003 establishments in Italy
2011 disestablishments in Italy
Italian-language television stations
Music organisations based in Italy